Fort Burgoyne, originally known as Castle Hill Fort, was built in the 1860s as one of the Palmerston forts around Dover in southeast England. It was built to a polygonal system with detached eastern and western redoubts, to guard the high ground northeast of the strategic port of Dover, just north of Dover Castle. The fort is named after the 19th century General John Fox Burgoyne, Inspector-General of Fortifications and son of the John Burgoyne who fought in the American Revolutionary War.

After the First World War Fort Burgoyne was used as a military depot or store for Connaught Barracks. Until recently the central part of the fort was still owned by the Ministry of Defence, forming part of the Connaught Barracks site, which is now being redeveloped for housing.

The site also includes 104 acres (42 hectares) of land.

The Land Trust now own the fort, and are restoring it for public access.

Waking The Giant 

On the 29 February 2020, Fort Burgoyne was opened to the public for a day. The event was called Waking the Giant and was run by Albion Inc, as part of a commission for Pioneering Places East Kent to map out the future uses of the fort. The event featured: The Museum Of British Folklore, Weaving & Knitting by Robert George Sanders & Katherine Woodward, Blacksmithing by Michael Hart, Ceramics by Ceramic Art Dover & Keith Brymer-Jones, A showing of the film Fortopia By Matt Rowe, a demo of the virtual reality game Escape created by Jake Price, A presentation of future fort use by Central St. Martins, A Makers Market by Future Foundry and Food & Drink by The White Cliffs & Real Deal Roasters.

The event was considered a success by Albion, Inc. and Pioneering Places East Kent, with an estimate of over 2000 people in attendance.

References

External links
 The Land Trust
Fort Burgoyne
Eastern Outworks
Victorian Forts data sheet

Palmerston Forts
Forts in Dover, Kent
Military history of Dover, Kent